Line 12 of the Shenzhen Metro is one of the four new metro lines of Phase IV expansion in the Chinese city of Shenzhen. Its construction began in 2017 and it opened on 28 November 2022. The line uses six car type A trains and runs north to south on the east banks of the Pearl River Delta.

Stations

Phase 1
Phase 1 of the line is 40.56 km in length with 33 stations.

Phase 2 (North extension)
The under construction Phase 2 to  will add 6 stations north of Waterlands Resort East and extend the line to Line 6 and Line 11. The extension is 8.16 km in length, and will open in 2025.

References

Shenzhen Metro lines
Railway lines opened in 2022
Airport rail links in China